Solenandra is a genus of flowering plant in the family Rubiaceae, native from Mexico to Central America and the Caribbean. The genus was established by Joseph Dalton Hooker in 1873.

Species
, Plants of the World Online accepted the following species:

Solenandra angustifolia (Sw.) Paudyal & Delprete
Solenandra brachycarpa (Sw.) Paudyal & Delprete
Solenandra cordata (Borhidi & M.Fernández) Borhidi
Solenandra curbeloi (Borhidi & M.Fernández) Borhidi
Solenandra elliptica (Griseb.) Paudyal & Delprete
Solenandra ixoroides Hook.f.
Solenandra lineata (Vahl) Paudyal & Delprete
Solenandra longiflora (Lamb.) Paudyal & Delprete
Solenandra mexicana (A.Gray) Borhidi
Solenandra microcarpa (Borhidi & M.Fernández) Borhidi
Solenandra myrtifolia (Griseb.) Borhidi
Solenandra parviflora (A.Rich. ex Bonpl.) Borhidi
Solenandra pervestita (Borhidi & M.Fernández) Borhidi
Solenandra polyphylla (Urb. & Ekman) Paudyal & Delprete
Solenandra pulverulenta (Borhidi) Borhidi
Solenandra rotundata (Griseb.) Paudyal & Delprete
Solenandra sanctae-luciae (Kentish) Paudyal & Delprete
Solenandra selleana (Urb. & Ekman) Borhidi
Solenandra stenophylla (Britton) Paudyal & Delprete
Solenandra triflora (W.Wright) Paudyal & Delprete
Solenandra velutina (Standl.) Borhidi

References

Chiococceae
Rubiaceae genera